Blood of Amber is a fantasy novel by American writer Roger Zelazny, published in 1986. It is the second book in the second Chronicles of Amber series, and the seventh book overall in the Amber series.

Plot summary
Merlin escapes from the crystal cave, and decides to gain leverage over Luke by rescuing his mother from the Keep of the Four Worlds. He spars with the sorcerer who now controls the keep, and who seems to know him. He escapes with the petrified Jasra, and returns to Amber where an unusual Trump summoning imprisons him in the Mad Hatter's tea party.

Release details
The book was published simultaneously in a limited edition of 400 signed and numbered copies, by Underwood/Miller and also a trade edition, by Arbor House.

References to other works 
When Merlin first spies the Keep of the Four Worlds, he describes it as "an amazingly huge and complex structure, which I immediately christened Gormenghast". "Gormenghast" is the name of the sprawling, crumbling fortress from Mervyn Peake's Gormenghast trilogy.

Reception
Dave Langford reviewed Blood of Amber for White Dwarf #97, and stated that "despite a few good wisecracks and neat ideas, Corey's plethora of powers can't revitalise the over-familiar Amber gimmickry and revenge plot".

Reviews
Review by Debbie Notkin (1986) in Locus, #307 August 1986
Review by Laurel Anderson Tryforos (1986) in Fantasy Review, October 1986
Review by Don D'Ammassa (1986) in Science Fiction Chronicle, #85 October 1986
Review by John Gregory Betancourt (1987) in Fantasy Book, March 1987
Review by Tom Easton (1987) in Analog Science Fiction/Science Fact, July 1987
Review by Graham Andrews (1987) in Paperback Inferno, #69

References

Sources

External links
 Blood of Amber at Worlds Without End

The Chronicles of Amber books
1986 fantasy novels
Arbor House books